The 2017–18 Denver Nuggets season was the 42nd season of the franchise in the National Basketball Association (NBA). On June 15, 2017, the Nuggets officially promoted both Artūras Karnišovas and Tim Connelly to become the team's newest general manager and president of basketball operations respectively. On December 2, 2017, the Nuggets would retire Fat Lever's number during their 115–100 win over the Los Angeles Lakers. Despite compiling their first winning season since 2013, they missed the playoffs for the fifth straight season after losing to the Minnesota Timberwolves in a win-or-go-home situation in the regular season finale, also ending the Timberwolves' 14-year playoff drought.

Draft

Roster

<noinclude>

Standings

Division

Conference

Game log

Preseason

|- style="background:#bfb;"
| 1
| September 30
| @ Golden State
| 
| Paul Millsap (22)
| Paul Millsap (11)
| Emmanuel Mudiay (6)
| Oracle Arena19,596
| 1–0
|- style="background:#bfb;"
| 2
| October 2
| @ LA Lakers
| 
| Gary Harris (25)
| Juan Hernangómez (6)
| Barton, Mudiay (4)
| Staples Center17,218
| 2–0
|- style="background:#bfb;"
| 3
| October 4
| @ LA Lakers
| 
| Kenneth Faried (20)
| Mason Plumlee (16)
| Mason Plumlee (7)
| Citizens Business Bank Arena17,000
| 3–0
|- style="background:#fcc;"
| 4
| October 8
| @ San Antonio
| 
| Nikola Jokić (19)
| Jokić, Millsap (7)
| Jameer Nelson (5)
| AT&T Center17,832
| 3–1
|- style="background:#fcc;"
| 5
| October 10
| Oklahoma City
| 
| Will Barton (26)
| Nikola Jokić (11)
| Murray, Nelson (4)
| Pepsi CenterN/A
| 3–2

Regular season

|- style="background:#fbb;"
| 1
| October 18
| @ Utah
| 
| Paul Millsap (19)
| Nikola Jokić (12)
| Nikola Jokić (8)
| Vivint Smart Home Arena17,588
| 0–1
|- style="background:#bfb;"
| 2
| October 21
| Sacramento
| 
| Faried, Millsap (18)
| Wilson Chandler (12)
| Nikola Jokić (7)
| Pepsi Center19,520
| 1–1
|- style="background:#fbb;"
| 3
| October 23
| Washington
| 
| Nikola Jokić (29)
| Nikola Jokić (9)
| Harris, Murray (6)
| Pepsi Center14,294
| 1–2
|- style="background:#fbb;"
| 4
| October 25
| @ Charlotte
| 
| Harris, Jokić (18)
| Nikola Jokić (11)
| Will Barton (6)
| Spectrum Center14,253
| 1–3
|- style="background:#bfb;"
| 5
| October 27
| @ Atlanta
| 
| Barton, Harris, Jokić (18)
| Nikola Jokić (15)
| Mason Plumlee (6)
| Philips Arena16,220
| 2–3
|- style="background:#bfb;"
| 6
| October 29
| @ Brooklyn
| 
| Nikola Jokić (21)
| Nikola Jokić (14)
| Millsap, Mudiay, Murray (5)
| Barclays Center14,854
| 3–3
|- style="background:#fbb;"
| 7
| October 30
| @ NY Knicks
| 
| Nikola Jokić (28)
| Paul Millsap (10)
| Chandler, Millsap (4)
| Madison Square Garden19,812
| 3–4

|- style="background:#bfb;"
| 8
| November 1
| Toronto
| 
| Jamal Murray (24)
| Nikola Jokić (16)
| Nikola Jokić (10)
| Pepsi Center14,072
| 4–4
|- style="background:#bfb;"
| 9
| November 3
| Miami
| 
| Paul Millsap (27)
| Nikola Jokić (14)
| Paul Millsap (5)
| Pepsi Center15,317
| 5–4
|- style="background:#fbb;"
| 10
| November 4
| Golden State
| 
| Will Barton (21)
| Will Barton (8)
| Emmanuel Mudiay (7)
| Pepsi Center19,711
| 5–5
|- style="background:#bfb;"
| 11
| November 7
| Brooklyn
| 
| Nikola Jokić (41)
| Nikola Jokić (12)
| Harris & Jokić (5)
| Pepsi Center14,058
| 6–5
|- style="background:#bfb;"
| 12
| November 9
| Oklahoma City
| 
| Emmanuel Mudiay (21)
| Nikola Jokić (11)
| Millsap & Mudiay (5)
| Pepsi Center19,520
| 7–5
|- style="background:#bfb;"
| 13
| November 11
| Orlando
| 
| Jamal Murray (32)
| Nikola Jokić (17)
| Nikola Jokić (8)
| Pepsi Center16,688
| 8–5
|- style="background:#fbb;"
| 14
| November 13
| @ Portland
| 
| Paul Millsap (18)
| Wilson Chandler (7)
| Wilson Chandler (6)
| Moda Center18,895
| 8–6
|- style="background:#bfb;"
| 15
| November 17
| New Orleans
| 
| Jamal Murray (31)
| Chandler, Jokić (11)
| Paul Millsap (7)
| Pepsi Center16,816
| 9–6
|- style="background:#fbb;"
| 16
| November 19
| @ LA Lakers
| 
| Gary Harris (20)
| Trey Lyles (8)
| Emmanuel Mudiay (7)
| Staples Center18,997
| 9–7
|- style="background:#bfb;"
| 17
| November 20
| @ Sacramento
| 
| Will Barton (25)
| Nikola Jokić (14)
| Will Barton (5)
| Golden 1 Center17,583
| 10–7
|- style="background:#fbb;"
| 18
| November 22
| @ Houston
| 
| Will Barton (20)
| Mason Plumlee (8)
| Barton, Jokić, Lyles, Mudiay, Murray (3)
| Toyota Center18,055
| 10–8
|- style="background:#bfb;"
| 19
| November 24
| Memphis
| 
| Nikola Jokić (28)
| Nikola Jokić (13)
| Nikola Jokić (8)
| Pepsi Center16,736
| 11–8
|- style="background:#fbb;"
| 20
| November 28
| @ Utah
| 
| Gary Harris (18)
| Juan Hernangómez (10)
| Nikola Jokić (6)
| Vivint Smart Home Arena16,790
| 11–9
|- style="background:#bfb;"
| 21
| November 30
| Chicago
| 
| Will Barton (37)
| Kenneth Faried (13)
| Nikola Jokić (4)
| Pepsi Center15,156
| 12–9

|- style="background:#bfb;"
| 22
| December 2
| LA Lakers
| 
| Jamal Murray (28)
| Kenneth Faried (8)
| Harris, Plumlee (6)
| Pepsi Center19,520
| 13–9
|- style="background:#fbb;"
| 23
| December 4
| @ Dallas
| 
| Will Barton (23)
| Kenneth Faried (11)
| Will Barton (6)
| American Airlines Center19,419
| 13–10
|- style="background:#fbb;"
| 24
| December 6
| @ New Orleans
| 
| Gary Harris (24)
| Trey Lyles (11)
| Harris, Lyles (4)
| Smoothie King Center15,353
| 13–11
|- style="background:#bfb;"
| 25
| December 8
| @ Orlando
| 
| Kenneth Faried (20)
| Kenneth Faried (10)
| Barton, Mudiay (5)
| Amway Center16,024
| 14–11
|- style="background:#fbb;"
| 26
| December 10
| @ Indiana
| 
| Trey Lyles (25)
| Kenneth Faried (11)
| Will Barton (9)
| Bankers Life Fieldhouse14,587
| 14–12
|- style="background:#bfb;"
| 27
| December 12
| @ Detroit
| 
| Jamal Murray (28)
| Mason Plumlee (13)
| Will Barton (10)
| Little Caesars Arena15,494
| 15–12
|- style="background:#fbb;"
| 28
| December 13
| @ Boston
| 
| Gary Harris (36)
| Faried, Murray (10)
| Gary Harris (6)
| TD Garden18,624
| 15–13
|- style="background:#bfb;"
| 29
| December 15
| New Orleans
| 
| Gary Harris (21)
| Nikola Jokić (11)
| Will Barton (6)
| Pepsi Center17,584
| 16–13
|- style="background:#fbb;"
| 30
| December 18
| @ Oklahoma City
| 
| Gary Harris (17)
| Wilson Chandler (10)
| Will Barton (7)
| Chesapeake Energy Arena18,203
| 16–14
|- style="background:#fbb;"
| 31
| December 20
| Minnesota
| 
| Jamal Murray (30)
| Chandler, Plumlee (10)
| Chandler, Plumlee (6)
| Pepsi Center17,002
| 16–15
|- style="background:#bfb;"
| 32
| December 22
| @ Portland
| 
| Nikola Jokić (27)
| Wilson Chandler (11)
| Nikola Jokić (6)
| Moda Center19,473
| 17–15
|- style="background:#bfb;"
| 33
| December 23
| @ Golden State
| 
| Gary Harris (19)
| Chandler, Jokić (9)
| Will Barton (7)
| Oracle Arena19,596
| 18–15
|- style="background:#bfb;"
| 34
| December 26
| Utah
| 
| Jamal Murray (22)
| Murray, Lyles, Plumlee (8)
| Barton, Harris, Jokić (5)
| Pepsi Center17,104
| 19–15
|- style="background:#fbb;"
| 35
| December 27
| @ Minnesota
| 
| Nikola Jokić (22)
| Trey Lyles (10)
| Jamal Murray (8)
| Target Center18,978
| 19–16
|- style="background:#fbb;"
| 36
| December 30
| Philadelphia
| 
| Jamal Murray (31)
| Nikola Jokić (13)
| Nikola Jokić (6)
| Pepsi Center19,599
| 19–17

|- style="background:#bfb;"
| 37
| January 3
| Phoenix
| 
| Gary Harris (36)
| Trey Lyles (11)
| Nikola Jokić (8)
| Pepsi Center14,079
| 20–17
|- style="background:#bfb;"
| 38
| January 5
| Utah
| 
| Lyles, Murray (26)
| Nikola Jokić (10)
| Will Barton (8)
| Pepsi Center15,557
| 21–17
|- style="background:#fbb;"
| 39
| January 6
| @ Sacramento
| 
| Trey Lyles (19)
| Trey Lyles (9)
| Nikola Jokić (10)
| Golden 1 Center17,583
| 21–18
|- style="background:#fbb;"
| 40
| January 8
| @ Golden State
| 
| Harris, Jokić (22)
| Nikola Jokić (12)
| Nikola Jokić (11)
| Oracle Arena19,596
| 21–19
|- style="background:#fbb;"
| 41
| January 10
| Atlanta
| 
| Gary Harris (25)
| Nikola Jokić (12)
| Nikola Jokić (7)
| Pepsi Center14,182
| 21–20
|- style="background:#bfb;"
| 42
| January 12
| Memphis
| 
| Will Barton (17)
| Mason Plumlee (9)
| Barton, Jokić, Murray, Plumlee (3)
| Pepsi Center15,607
| 22–20
|- style="background:#fbb;"
| 43
| January 13
| @ San Antonio
| 
| Nikola Jokić (23)
| Nikola Jokić (9)
| Nikola Jokić (7)
| AT&T Center18,418
| 22–21
|- style="background:#bfb;"
| 44
| January 16
| Dallas
| 
| Nikola Jokić (29)
| Nikola Jokić (18)
| Nikola Jokić (7)
| Pepsi Center14,097
| 23–21
|- style="background:#fbb;"
| 45
| January 17
| @ L.A. Clippers
| 
| Gary Harris (19)
| Mason Plumlee (14)
| Will Barton (6)
| Staples Center15,043
| 23–22
|- style="background:#fbb;"
| 46
| January 19
| Phoenix
| 
| Jamal Murray (30)
| Nikola Jokić (17)
| Nikola Jokić (5)
| Pepsi Center15,732
| 23–23
|- style="background:#bfb;"
| 47
| January 22
| Portland
| 
| Jamal Murray (38)
| Nikola Jokić (12)
| Jamal Murray (6)
| Pepsi Center14,474
| 24–23
|- style="background:#bfb;"
| 48
| January 25
| New York
| 
| Gary Harris (23)
| Nikola Jokić (7)
| Nikola Jokić (10)
| Pepsi Center15,482
| 25–23
|- style="background:#bfb;"
| 49
| January 27
| Dallas
| 
| Gary Harris (24)
| Nikola Jokić (16)
| Nikola Jokić (11)
| Pepsi Center19,520
| 26–23
|- style="background:#fbb;"
| 50
| January 29
| Boston
| 
| Nikola Jokić (24)
| Nikola Jokić (11)
| Jamal Murray (8)
| Pepsi Center19,520
| 26–24
|- style="background:#fbb;"
| 51
| January 30
| @ San Antonio
| 
| Jamal Murray (18)
| Jokić, Lyles (7)
| Nikola Jokić (8)
| AT&T Center18,418
| 26–25

|- style="background:#bfb;"
| 52
| February 1
| Oklahoma City
| 
| Jamal Murray (33)
| Nikola Jokić (13)
| Nikola Jokić (14)
| Pepsi Center18,407
| 27–25
|- style="background:#bfb;"
| 53
| February 3
| Golden State
| 
| Will Barton (25)
| Trey Lyles (10)
| Nikola Jokić (5)
| Pepsi Center20,103
| 28–25
|- style="background:#bfb;"
| 54
| February 5
| Charlotte
| 
| Gary Harris (27)
| Nikola Jokić (16)
| Jokic, Murray (7)
| Pepsi Center14,410
| 29–25
|- style="background:#fbb;"
| 55
| February 9
| @ Houston
| 
| Trey Lyles (24)
| Nikola Jokić (7)
| Monte Morris (6)
| Toyota Center18,055
| 29–26
|- style="background:#bfb;"
| 56
| February 10
| @ Phoenix
| 
| Wilson Chandler (26)
| Nikola Jokić (9)
| Nikola Jokić (8)
| Talking Stick Resort Arena16,325
| 30–26
|- style="background:#bfb;"
| 57
| February 13
| San Antonio
| 
| Nikola Jokić (23)
| Nikola Jokić (13)
| Nikola Jokić (11)
| Pepsi Center17,623
| 31–26
|- style="background:#bfb;"
| 58
| February 15
| @ Milwaukee
| 
| Nikola Jokić (30)
| Nikola Jokić (15)
| Nikola Jokić (17)
| Bradley Center15,486
| 32–26
|- align="center"
|colspan="9" bgcolor="#bbcaff"|All-Star Break
|- style="background:#bfb;"
| 59
| February 23
| San Antonio
| 
| Nikola Jokić (28)
| Wilson Chandler (16)
| Nikola Jokić (11)
| Pepsi Center20,027
| 33–26
|- style="background:#fbb;"
| 60
| February 25
| Houston
| 
| Will Barton (25)
| Nikola Jokić (14)
| Nikola Jokić (8)
| Pepsi Center20,044
| 33–27
|- style="background:#fbb;"
| 61
| February 27
| LA Clippers
| 
| Gary Harris (23)
| Wilson Chandler (8)
| Wilson Chandler (6)
| Pepsi Center15,004
| 33–28

|- style="background:#bfb;"
| 62
| March 2
| @ Memphis
| 
| Gary Harris (26)
| Nikola Jokić (9)
| Nikola Jokić (5)
| FedExForum16,421
| 34–28
|- style="background:#bfb;"
| 63
| March 3
| @ Cleveland
| 
| Gary Harris (32)
| Will Barton (8)
| Nikola Jokić (8)
| Quicken Loans Arena20.562
| 35–28
|- style="background:#fbb;"
| 64
| March 6
| @ Dallas
| 
| Wilson Chandler (21)
| Nikola Jokić (9)
| Will Barton (7)
| American Airlines Center19,504
| 35–29
|- style="background:#fbb;"
| 65
| March 7
| Cleveland
| 
| Nikola Jokić (36)
| Nikola Jokić (13)
| Nikola Jokić (6)
| Pepsi Center20,062
| 35–30
|- style="background:#bfb;"
| 66
| March 9
| LA Lakers
| 
| Jamal Murray (22)
| Jokić, Millsap (6)
| Jamal Murray (8)
| Pepsi Center19,807
| 36–30
|- style="background:#bfb;"
| 67
| March 11
| Sacramento
| 
| Gary Harris (21)
| Nikola Jokić (11)
| Nikola Jokić (10)
| Pepsi Center19,520
| 37–30
|- style="background:#fbb;"
| 68
| March 13
| @ LA Lakers
| 
| Wilson Chandler (26)
| Wilson Chandler (10)
| Jokić, Plumlee (5)
| Staples Center18,997
| 37–31
|- style="background:#bfb;"
| 69
| March 15
| Detroit
| 
| Jamal Murray (26)
| Nikola Jokić (12)
| Nikola Jokić (10)
| Pepsi Center18,697
| 38–31
|- style="background:#fbb;"
| 70
| March 17
| @ Memphis
| 
| Nikola Jokić (17)
| Nikola Jokić (12)
| Murray, Plumlee (3)
| FedExForum16,501
| 38–32
|- style="background:#fbb;"
| 71
| March 19
| @ Miami
| 
| Nikola Jokić (34)
| Nikola Jokić (14)
| Devin Harris (9)
| American Airlines Arena19,600
| 38–33
|- style="background:#bfb;"
| 72
| March 21
| @ Chicago
| 
| Paul Millsap (22)
| Paul Millsap (8)
| Jamal Murray (7)
| United Center20,671
| 39–33
|- style="background:#bfb;"
| 73
| March 23
| @ Washington
| 
| Jokić, Murray (25)
| Nikola Jokić (8)
| Jokić, Millsap (5)
| Capital One Arena19,016
| 40–33
|- style="background:#fbb;"
| 74
| March 26
| @ Philadelphia
| 
| Will Barton (25)
| Paul Millsap (9)
| Wilson Chandler (7)
| Wells Fargo Center20,585
| 40–34
|- style="background:#fbb;"
| 75
| March 27
| @ Toronto
| 
| Nikola Jokić (29)
| Nikola Jokić (16)
| Nikola Jokić (8)
| Air Canada Centre19,800
| 40–35
|- style="background:#bfb;"
| 76
| March 30
| @ Oklahoma City
| 
| Paul Millsap (36)
| Nikola Jokić (16)
| Nikola Jokić (6)
| Chesapeake Energy Arena18,203
| 41–35

|- style="background:#bfb;"
| 77
| April 1
| Milwaukee
| 
| Nikola Jokić (35)
| Millsap, Jokic (13)
| Jamal Murray (7)
| Pepsi Center19,520
| 42–35
|- style="background:#bfb;"
| 78
| April 3
| Indiana
| 
| Nikola Jokić (30)
| Will Barton (10)
| Jokić, Murray (7)
| Pepsi Center14,743
| 43–35
|- style="background:#bfb;"
| 79
| April 5
| Minnesota
| 
| Jamal Murray (22)
| Nikola Jokić (14)
| Nikola Jokić (9)
| Pepsi Center16,415
| 44–35
|- style="background:#bfb;"
| 80
| April 7
| @ LA Clippers
| 
| Will Barton (31)
| Nikola Jokić (11)
| Nikola Jokić (11)
| Staples Center16,166
| 45–35
|- style="background:#bfb;"
| 81
| April 9
| Portland
| 
| Will Barton (22)
| Nikola Jokić (20)
| Nikola Jokić (11)
| Pepsi Center17,467
| 46–35
|- style="background:#fbb;"
| 82
| April 11
| @ Minnesota
| 
|Nikola Jokić (35)
|Nikola Jokić (10)
|Jamal Murray (6)
| Target Center18,978
| 46–36

Player statistics

Regular season

|- align="center" bgcolor=""
| 
| 19 || 1 || 7.4 || .468 || .348 || .667 || .8 || .5 || .4 || .2 || 2.8
|- align="center" bgcolor=""
| 
| style=|81 || 40 || 33.1 || .452 || .370 || .805 || 5.0 || 4.1 || 1.0 || .6 || 15.7
|- align="center" bgcolor=""
| 
| 62 || 0 || 9.4 || .410 || .341 || .667 || 1.1 || .5 || .2 || .1 || 3.2
|- align="center" bgcolor=""
| 
| 74 || 71 || 31.7 || .445 || .358 || .772 || 5.4 || 2.2 || .6 || .5 || 10.0
|- align="center" bgcolor=""
| 
| 39 || 5 || 16.1 || .453 || .293 || .629 || 3.3 || .6 || .3 || .4 || 4.2
|- align="center" bgcolor=""
| 
| 32 || 7 || 14.4 || .514 || .000 || .706 || 4.8 || .6 || .4 || .4 || 5.9
|- align="center" bgcolor=""
| 
| 27 || 0 || 19.7 || .406 || .343 || .845 || 1.6 || 2.5 || .5 || .1 || 8.2
|- align="center" bgcolor=""
| 
| 67 || 65 || style=|34.4 || .485 || style=|.396 || .827 || 2.6 || 2.9 || style=|1.8 || .2 || 17.5
|- align="center" bgcolor=""
| 
| 25 || 3 || 11.1 || .387 || .280 || .833 || 2.2 || .5 || .2 || .1 || 3.3
|- align="center" bgcolor=""
| 
| 20 || 0 || 8.2 || .444 || .286 || .571 || .9 || .8 || .1 || .1 || 1.5
|- align="center" bgcolor=""
| 
| 75 || 73 || 32.6 || .499 || style=|.396 || .850 || style=|10.7 || style=|6.1 || 1.2 || .8 || style=|18.5
|- align="center" bgcolor=""
| 
| 1 || 0 || 2.0 || .000 || .000 || .000 || .0 || .0 || .0 || .0 || .0
|- align="center" bgcolor=""
| 
| 73 || 2 || 19.1 || .491 || .381 || .697 || 4.8 || 1.2 || .4 || .5 || 9.9
|- align="center" bgcolor=""
| 
| 38 || 37 || 30.1 ||.464 || .345 || .696 || 6.4 || 2.7 || 1.0 || style=|1.2 || 14.6
|- align="center" bgcolor=""
| 
| 3 || 0 || 8.3 || style=|.667 || .000 || style=|1.000 || .7 || 2.3 || 1.0 || .0 || 3.3
|- align="center" bgcolor=""
| 
| 42 || 0 || 17.9 || .401 || .373 || .808 || 2.2 || 2.9 || .5 || .1 || 8.5
|- align="center" bgcolor=""
| 
| style=|81 || style=|80 || 31.7 || .451 || .378 || .905 || 3.7 || 3.4 || 1.0 || .3 || 16.7
|- align="center" bgcolor=""
| 
| 74 || 26 || 19.4 || .601 || .000 || .456 || 5.4 || 1.9 || .7 || 1.1 || 7.1
|}

 Statistics with the Denver Nuggets

Transactions

Trades

Contracts

Re-signed

Additions

 ^ Team's second round draft pick this year.

Subtractions

References

Denver Nuggets seasons
Denver Nuggets
Denver Nuggets
Denver Nuggets